The following outline is provided as an overview of and topical guide to Bahrain:

Bahrain – Islamic sovereign island nation located in the Persian Gulf.  In the late 1800s, following successive treaties with the British, Bahrain became a protectorate of the United Kingdom. Following the withdrawal of the British from the region in the late 1960s, Bahrain declared independence in 1971. Formerly a state, Bahrain was declared a "Kingdom" in 2002. Since early 2011, the country has experienced sustained protests and unrest inspired by the regional Arab Spring, particularly by the majority Shia population.

General reference

 Pronunciation:
 Common English country name:  Bahrain
 Official English country name:  The Kingdom of Bahrain
 Common endonym(s):  
 Official endonym(s):  
 Adjectival(s): Bahraini
 Demonym(s):
 Etymology: Name of Bahrain
 International rankings of Bahrain
 ISO country codes: BH, BHR, 048
 ISO region codes: See ISO 3166-2:BH
 Internet country code top-level domain: .bh

Geography of Bahrain 

Geography of Bahrain
 Bahrain is: an island country
 Location:
 Northern Hemisphere and Eastern Hemisphere
 Indian Ocean
 Persian Gulf
 Eurasia
 Asia
 Southwest Asia
 Middle East
 Gulf of Bahrain
 Time zone:  UTC+03
 Extreme points of Bahrain
 High:  Jabal ad Dukhan 
 Low:  Persian Gulf 0 m
 Land boundaries:  none
 Coastline:  161 km
 Population of Bahrain: 1,046,814(2007) - 154th most populous country
 
 Area of Bahrain:  - 189th largest country
 Atlas of Bahrain

Environment of Bahrain 

 Climate of Bahrain
 Renewable energy in Bahrain
 Geology of Bahrain
 Protected areas of Bahrain
 Biosphere reserves in Bahrain
 National parks of Bahrain
 Wildlife of Bahrain
 Fauna of Bahrain
 Birds of Bahrain
 Mammals of Bahrain

Natural geographic features of Bahrain 

 Beaches in Bahrain
 Gulf of Bahrain
 Hills in Bahrain
 Mountain of Smoke
 Islands of Bahrain
 Amwaj Islands
 Hawar Islands
 Lakes of Bahrain: None
 Rivers of Bahrain
 Waterfalls of Bahrain: None
 Valleys of Bahrain
 World Heritage Sites in Bahrain
 Bahrain Pearling Trail
 Qal'at al-Bahrain – was the capital of the Dilmun, one of the most important ancient civilizations of the region. It contains the richest remains inventoried of this civilization, which was hitherto only known from written Sumerian references.

Regions of Bahrain 

Former regions of Bahrain
 Western Region, Bahrain
 Al Wusta Region (Bahrain)
 Ash Shamaliyah Region

Ecoregions of Bahrain 

List of ecoregions in Bahrain

Administrative divisions of Bahrain 

Administrative divisions of Bahrain
 Governorates of Bahrain
 Cities in Bahrain

Governorates of Bahrain 

Governorates of Bahrain
 Capital
 Muharraq
 Northern
 Southern

Cities in Bahrain

 List of cities in Bahrain
 A'ali
 Arad
 Budaiya
 Busaiteen
 Ad-Dawr
 Hamad Town
 Al Hidd
 Isa Town
 Jidhafs
 Madinat 'Isa
 Malkiya
 Manama
 Al Muharraq
 Riffa
 Former municipalities of Bahrain

Demography of Bahrain 

Demographics of Bahrain

Government and politics of Bahrain 

Politics of Bahrain
 Form of government: constitutional monarchy
 Capital of Bahrain: Manama
 Elections in Bahrain
 Political parties in Bahrain
 1981 failed coup d'état in Bahrain
 1990s Uprising in Bahrain
 Adel Mouwda
 Al-Menbar Islamic Society
 Al Muntada
 Al Wefaq
 Alees Samaan
 Ali Ahmed
 Ali Mattar
 Ali Salman
 Asalah
 Bahrain Centre for Human Rights
 Bahrain Freedom Movement
 Bahrain Human Rights Society
 Bahrain Human Rights Watch Society
 Bahrain national dialogue
 Bahraini opposition
 Bandargate scandal
 Boycott Batelco
 Constitution of Bahrain
 Consultative Council of Bahrain
 Council of Representatives of Bahrain
 Economists Bloc
 Faisal Fulad
 Gay rights in Bahrain
 Islamic Front for the Liberation of Bahrain
 Jassim Al Saeedi
 Majeed Karimi
 Khalifa Al Dhahrani
 Lulwa Al Awadhi
 Mohammed Khalid
 National Action Charter of Bahrain
 National Assembly of Bahrain
 National Justice Movement
 Supreme Council for Women
 Women's political rights in Bahrain
 Workers Trade Union Law

Liberalism in Bahrain
 Al Muntada
 Sawsan Al Sha'er
 Haya Rashed Al-Khalifa
 Bahrain Human Rights Watch Society
 Economists Bloc
 We Have A Right
 Women's political rights in Bahrain

Political parties in Bahrain
 List of political parties in Bahrain
 Al Meethaq
 Al-Menbar Islamic Society
 Al Wefaq
 Asalah
 Baath Party
 Democratic Bloc
 Democratic Progressive Tribune - Bahrain
 Islamic Action Society
 National Action Charter Society
 National Democratic Action
 National Liberation Front - Bahrain
 Nationalist Democratic Rally Society

Bahraini politicians
 Adel Mouwda
 Ahmad Al-Thawadi
 Salman bin Hamad bin Isa Al Khalifa
 Alees Samaan
 Ali Ahmed
 Ali Mattar
 Ali Salman
 Tawfeeq Ahmed Almansoor
 Faisal Fulad
 Jassim Al Saeedi
 Majeed Karimi
 Khalid ibn Ahmad Al Khalifah
 Khalifa Al Dhahrani
 Lulwa Al Awadhi
 Mohammed Khalid
 Muhammad ibn Mubarak ibn Hamad Al Khalifah
 Nada Haffadh
 Khalifah ibn Sulman Al Khalifah

Branches of government

Government of Bahrain

Executive branch of the government of Bahrain 
 Head of state: King of Bahrain
 Head of government: Prime Minister of Bahrain
 Cabinet of Bahrain

Legislative branch of the government of Bahrain 
 Parliament of Bahrain (bicameral)
 Upper house: Consultative Council of Bahrain
 Lower house: Council of Representatives of Bahrain

Judicial branch of the government of Bahrain 

Court system of Bahrain
 Supreme Court of Bahrain

Foreign relations of Bahrain
 Foreign relations of Bahrain
 Diplomatic missions in Bahrain
 List of Ambassadors from the United Kingdom to Bahrain
 United States Ambassador to Bahrain
 Diplomatic missions of Bahrain
 Forum for the Future (Bahrain 2005)
 Major non-NATO ally

Bahraini diplomats
 Haya Rashed Al-Khalifa

International organization membership 
The Kingdom of Bahrain is a member of:

 Arab Bank for Economic Development in Africa (ABEDA)
 Arab Fund for Economic and Social Development (AFESD)
 Arab Monetary Fund (AMF)
 Cooperation Council for the Arab States of the Gulf (GCC)
 Food and Agriculture Organization (FAO)
 Group of 77 (G77)
 International Bank for Reconstruction and Development (IBRD)
 International Chamber of Commerce (ICC)
 International Civil Aviation Organization (ICAO)
 International Criminal Court (ICCt) (signatory)
 International Criminal Police Organization (Interpol)
 International Development Association (IDA)
 International Federation of Red Cross and Red Crescent Societies (IFRCS)
 International Finance Corporation (IFC)
 International Hydrographic Organization (IHO)
 International Labour Organization (ILO)
 International Maritime Organization (IMO)
 International Mobile Satellite Organization (IMSO)
 International Monetary Fund (IMF)
 International Olympic Committee (IOC)
 International Organization for Migration (IOM) (observer)
 International Organization for Standardization (ISO)
 International Red Cross and Red Crescent Movement (ICRM)
 International Telecommunication Union (ITU)

 International Telecommunications Satellite Organization (ITSO)
 International Trade Union Confederation (ITUC)
 Inter-Parliamentary Union (IPU)
 Islamic Development Bank (IDB)
 League of Arab States (LAS)
 Multilateral Investment Guarantee Agency (MIGA)
 Nonaligned Movement (NAM)
 Organisation for the Prohibition of Chemical Weapons (OPCW)
 Organization of Arab Petroleum Exporting Countries (OAPEC)
 Organisation of Islamic Cooperation (OIC)
 Permanent Court of Arbitration (PCA)
 United Nations (UN)
 United Nations Conference on Trade and Development (UNCTAD)
 United Nations Educational, Scientific, and Cultural Organization (UNESCO)
 United Nations Industrial Development Organization (UNIDO)
 Universal Postal Union (UPU)
 World Customs Organization (WCO)
 World Federation of Trade Unions (WFTU)
 World Health Organization (WHO)
 World Intellectual Property Organization (WIPO)
 World Meteorological Organization (WMO)
 World Tourism Organization (UNWTO)
 World Trade Organization (WTO)

Law and order in Bahrain 

Law of Bahrain
 Constitution of Bahrain
 Crime in Bahrain
 Human rights in Bahrain
Law enforcement in Bahrain
 Prisons in Bahrain
 Public Security Forces
Special Security Force Command

Human rights in Bahrain
Human rights in Bahrain
 Al Muntada
 Faisal Fulad
 Freedom of religion in Bahrain
 Human rights organizations in Bahrain
 Bahrain Centre for Human Rights
 Bahrain Human Rights Society
 Bahrain Human Rights Watch Society
 LGBT rights in Bahrain
 Lulwa Al Awadhi
 Supreme Council for Women
 We Have A Right
 Women's political rights in Bahrain
 Workers Trade Union Law

Torture in Bahrain
 Torture in Bahrain
 Adel Flaifel
 Ian Henderson (Britain)
 Royal Decree 56 of 2002
 State Security Law of 1974

Military of Bahrain 

Military of Bahrain
 Command
 Commander-in-chief: King Hamad ibn Isa Al Khalifa
 Ministry of Defence of Bahrain
 Forces
 Army of Bahrain
 Navy of Bahrain
 Air Force of Bahrain
 Royal Guard
 Military history of Bahrain
 Military ranks of Bahrain

Local government in Bahrain 

Local government in Bahrain

History of Bahrain

History of Bahrain
 History of Bahrain (1783–1971)
 1981 failed coup d'état in Bahrain
 1990s Uprising in Bahrain
 Arad Fort
 Awal
 Bab Al Bahrain
 Baharna
 Bahrain Independence Day
 Barbar temple
 Charles Belgrave
 Dilmun
 First Oil Well, Bahrain
 Former municipalities of Bahrain
 Forum for the Future (Bahrain 2005)
 Hamad ibn Isa Al Khalifa (1872-1942)
 Isa ibn Ali Al Khalifa
 Al Muharraq
 National Action Charter of Bahrain
 National Liberation Front - Bahrain
 Qal'at al-Bahrain
 Qarmatians
 Riffa Fort
 Salman ibn Hamad Al Khalifa (1895-1961)

Archaeological sites in Bahrain
 Archaeological sites in Bahrain
 Barbar temple
 Dilmun Burial Mounds
 Qal'at al-Bahrain
 Riffa Fort

Disasters in Bahrain
 2006 Bahrain ferry disaster

Culture of Bahrain 

Culture of Bahrain
 Architecture of Bahrain
 Forts in Bahrain
 Arad Fort
 Qal'at al-Bahrain
 Riffa Fort
 Tallest structures in Bahrain
 Art in Bahrain
 Cinema of Bahrain
 Literature of Bahrain
 Bahraini poetry
 Bahraini poets
 Ali Al Shargawi
 Ebrahim Al-Arrayedh
 Ali Al Jallawi
 Tarafa
 Mohammed Hasan Kamaluddin
 Music of Bahrain
 Ali Bahar
 Khalid Al-Thawadi
 Fijiri
 Sawt
 National Theatre of Bahrain
 Cuisine of Bahrain
 Festivals in Bahrain
 Holidays in Bahrain
 Bahrain Independence Day
 Languages of Bahrain
 Bahrani Arabic
 Gulf Arabic
 Media of Bahrain
 Censorship in Bahrain
 Newspapers in Bahrain
 Bahrain Radio and Television Corporation
 Radio in Bahrain
 Television in Bahrain
 Museums in Bahrain
 Bahrain National Museum
 Beit Al Qur'an
 National symbols of Bahrain
 Coat of arms of Bahrain
 Flag of Bahrain
 National anthem of Bahrain
 People of Bahrain
 Bahrani people
 Ethnic, cultural and religious groups of Bahrain
 Prostitution in Bahrain
 Public holidays in Bahrain
 Records of Bahrain
 Religion in Bahrain
 Buddhism in Bahrain
 Christianity in Bahrain
 Roman Catholicism in Bahrain
 Hinduism in Bahrain
 Islam in Bahrain
 Mosques in Bahrain
 Al Fateh Mosque
 Khamis Mosque
 Judaism in Bahrain
 Sikhism in Bahrain
 Scouting in Bahrain
 Boy Scouts of Bahrain
 The Girl Guides Association of Bahrain

Bahraini people
 List of Bahrainis
 Ali Abdulla Al-Ubaydli
 Mohammed ibn Jassim Al Ghatam
 Ebrahim Eshaq
 Rashid Al Zayani
 Fawzi Kanoo
 Farouk Yousif Almoayyed
 Abdulla Ahmed Nass

Bahraini families

Al Khalifa
 Al Khalifa
 Haya Rashed Al-Khalifa
 Hamad ibn Isa Al Khalifa (1872-1942)
 Hamad ibn Isa Al Khalifah
 Isa ibn Ali Al Khalifa
 Isa ibn Salman Al Khalifah
 Khalid ibn Ahmad Al Khalifah
 Faisal ibn Hamad Al Khalifah
 Khalifah ibn Sulman Al Khalifah
 Meriam Al-Khalifa
 Muhammad ibn Mubarak ibn Hamad Al Khalifah
 Salman bin Hamad bin Isa Al Khalifa
 Salman ibn Hamad Al Khalifa (1895-1961)

Al Bin Ali
 Al Bin Ali

Bahraini people by occupation

Bahraini activists
 Faisal Fulad
 Adel Flaifel

Bahraini actors

Bahraini television actors
 Zainab Al Askari

Bahraini journalists
 Yusuf al-ansari

Bahraini lawyers
 Haya Rashed Al-Khalifa
 Fatima Al-Hawaj

Bahraini musicians
 DJ Outlaw
Bahraini female DJ
 Dj Leil - Leila Sohrab

Bahraini singers

Bahraini female singers
 Hala Al Turk
 Hind (singer)

Bahraini male singers
 Ali Bahar
 Rashed Al-Majed
 Salem Allan
 Khaled El Sheikh
 Ala Ghawas

Bahraini pirates
 Rahmah bin Jabir al-Jalahimah

Bahraini prisoners and detainees
 Juma Mohammed Abdul Latif Al Dossary
 Salman Ebrahim Mohamed Ali Al Khalifa
 Essa Al Murbati
 Abdulla Majid Al Naimi

Sport in Bahrain

Bahraini Clubs
 Al-Ahli
 Al-Najma
 Bahrain Club
 Busaiteen Club
 Manama Club
 Muharraq Club
 Riffa
 Sitra Club

Cricket in Bahrain
 Bahraini cricket team

Football in Bahrain
 Bahrain Football Association
 Bahrain national football team
 Bahraini Premier League

Bahrain Grand Prix
 Bahrain Grand Prix
 2004 Bahrain Grand Prix
 2005 Bahrain Grand Prix
 2006 Bahrain Grand Prix
 2007 Bahrain Grand Prix
 2008 Bahrain Grand Prix
 2009 Bahrain Grand Prix
 2010 Bahrain Grand Prix
 2011 Bahrain Grand Prix
 2012 Bahrain Grand Prix
 Bahrain International Circuit

Bahrain at the Olympics
 Bahrain at the Olympics
 Bahrain at the 1984 Summer Olympics
 Bahrain at the 1988 Summer Olympics
 Bahrain at the 1992 Summer Olympics
 Bahrain at the 1996 Summer Olympics
 Bahrain at the 2000 Summer Olympics
 Bahrain at the 2004 Summer Olympics
 Bahrain at the 2008 Summer Olympics
 Bahrain at the 2012 Summer Olympics

Bahraini sportspeople

Bahraini footballers
 Salman Ghuloom
 A'ala Hubail
 Talal Yousef

Bahraini athletes
 Belal Mansoor Ali
 Maryam Yusuf Jamal
 Mushir Salem Jawher (until 2007)
 Yusuf Saad Kamel
 Aadam Ismaeel Khamis
 Rashid Ramzi
 Moustafa Ahmed Shebto
 Tareq Mubarak Taher

Sports venues in Bahrain
 Bahrain International Circuit
 Bahrain National Stadium

Football venues in Bahrain
 Al Ahli Stadium (Bahrain)
 Al Muharraq Stadium
 Bahrain National Stadium
 Madinat 'Isa Stadium

Economy and infrastructure of Bahrain

Economy of Bahrain
 Economic rank, by nominal GDP (2007): 96th (ninety-sixth)
 US-Bahrain Free Trade Agreement
 Agriculture in Bahrain
 Banking in Bahrain
 Bahraini dinar
 Bahrain Stock Exchange
 Banks of Bahrain
 Arab Banking
 Bank of Bahrain and Kuwait
 HSBC Bank Middle East
 Kuwait Finance House
 National Bank of Bahrain
 Shamil Bank of Bahrain
 Communications in Bahrain
 Internet in Bahrain
 .bh
 Telephone numbers in Bahrain
 Bahrain Radio and Television Corporation
 Batelco
 Boycott Batelco
 List of people on stamps of Bahrain
 Companies of Bahrain
 Al Muntazah
 Bapco Bahrain
 Batelco
 Bahrain Tradanet W.L.L.
 Computer World, Bahrain
 Gulf Petrochemical Industries Company
 Shamil Bank of Bahrain

 Currency of Bahrain: Dinar
 ISO 4217: BHD
 Energy in Bahrain
 Energy in Bahrain
 Energy policy of Bahrain
 Oil industry in Bahrain
 Healthcare in Bahrain
 List of hospitals in Bahrain
 Bahrain Royal Medical Services
 Ibn Al-Nafees Medical Hospital
 Mining in Bahrain
 Science and technology in Bahrain
 Bahrain Centre for Studies and Research
 Tourism in Bahrain
 Visitor attractions in Bahrain
 Arad Fort
 Bab Al Bahrain
 Bahrain Grand Prix
 Barbar temple
 Dilmun Burial Mounds
 First Oil Well, Bahrain
 Qal'at al-Bahrain
 Riffa Fort
 Visa policy of Bahrain
 World Heritage Sites in Bahrain: 1
 Qal'at al-Bahrain – was the capital of the Dilmun, one of the most important ancient civilizations of the region. It contains the richest remains inventoried of this civilization, which was hitherto only known from written Sumerian references.

Trade unions of Bahrain
 Bahrain Workers' Union
 General Federation of Workers Trade Unions in Bahrain

Transport in Bahrain
 Transport in Bahrain
 Air transport in Bahrain
 Airports in Bahrain
 Bahrain International Airport
 Airlines of Bahrain
 DHL International
 Gulf Air
 Gulf Traveller
 Rail transport in Bahrain
 Bahrain light rail network
 Road system in Bahrain
 Roads in Bahrain
 Bridges in Bahrain
 King Fahd Causeway
 Qatar–Bahrain Causeway

Education in Bahrain 
 Education in Bahrain
 Arab Open University
 University of Bahrain

Schools in Bahrain
 Hawar International School
 Al Noor International School
 Bahrain Bayan School
 Bahrain School
 St. Christopher's School, Bahrain
 IKNS
 Indian School, Bahrain
 Britus International School

See also 

Bahrain
 
 
 
 
 Index of Bahrain-related articles
 List of international rankings
 Outline of Asia

References

External links

 Kingdom of Bahrain (eGovernment Portal)
 Bahrain Tourism
 BBC Country profile: Bahrain
 Bahrain. The World Factbook. Central Intelligence Agency.
 Lonely Planet Destination Guide
 thebahrain.com Bahrain Travel & Tourism

Bahrain